Giovanni Srofenaur (28 February 15808 April 1634) was an Italian trumpeter; he served as court trumpeter for the Duke of Mantua during the time of the House of Gonzaga. He served as the lead trumpeter from 1606 to 1631, under Ferdinando I Gonzaga, Vincenzo II Gonzaga, and Charles I, Duke of Mantua and Montferrat. Srofenaur led the trumpet fanfare trio during the 1607 premier performance of Claudio Monteverdi's L'Orfeo. Srofenaur was born and died in Mantua.

References 
Kelly, Thomas Forrest, First Nights: Five Musical Premieres (Chelsea, Michigan: Yale University Press, 2000).

See also 
 List of trumpeters

1580 births
Italian trumpeters
Male trumpeters
Classical trumpeters
1634 deaths